Martin Voráček (born 21 December 1992) is a Czech football player who currently plays for Písek.

Club career
He made his Gambrinus liga debut for Slavia against Teplice on 22 August 2011.

References

1992 births
Living people
Czech footballers
Association football forwards
SK Slavia Prague players
FC Silon Táborsko players
Czech First League players
Czech National Football League players